Shijōnawate Shrine (四條畷神社, Shijōnawate jinja) is a Shinto shrine located in Shijōnawate, Osaka Prefecture, Japan. Its main festival is held annually on February 12. It was founded in 1890, and enshrines Kusunoki Masatsura along with 24 other kami. It is one of the Fifteen Shrines of the Kenmu Restoration.

See also
Fifteen Shrines of the Kenmu Restoration

External links
Official website
Osaka's Ikukunitama Shrine set to revive ritual for first time in 70 years

Shinto shrines in Osaka Prefecture
1890 establishments in Japan
Beppyo shrines